The following is a list of positions of authority.

Abuse of authority
Academic administration
Acting prime minister
Aspbed
Australian head of state dispute
Babysitter
Biy
Board of Ceremonies
Brotherly Leader and Guide of the Revolution
Captain (association football)
Chairman
Chamberlain (office)
Chief business officer
Chief executive (gubernatorial)
Chief executive officer
Chief Scout
Clergy
Coach (sport)
Conducting
Corporate title
Daigaku-no-kami
Derde
Development director
Dictator
Dictator perpetuo
Director general
Doctor
Duce
Espionage
Executive director
Father figure
Figurehead
Führer
General Secretary of the Communist Party
Generalissimo
Governor
Lieutenant governor
Grand chancellor (China)
Haty-a
Hazarbed
Head of state
Executive head teacher
Head teacher
Hofmeister (office)
Hou (title)
House of Sarkar
Hùng king
Al-hurra
Intellectual
Invisible dictatorship
Judge
Kaji (Nepal)
Kapitan Cina
Kgosi
Khevisberi
Kindins
King
King of Arms
Lord of Asia
Kiss up kick down
Kumar (title)
Lawyer
Layzanshah
Leader
Leadership of the People's Republic of China
Legislator
List of Kapitan Cina
List of leaders of North Korea
Lord of the manor
Magister militum
Magister officiorum
Mamasakhlisi
Mankari
Masmughan
Mayor
Mayor (France)
Mepe (title)
Monarch
Monarchy
Mukhtiyar
Mulkaji
Municipal commissioner
Music director
Nguyễn lords
Noyan
Officer
Officer of arms
Official
Paramount leader
Pharaoh
Photographer
Plutocrat
Police officer
Politician
Polygar
Portreeve
Praetorian prefect
Prefect
Premier
Presidency
President
President of the Council of State
Prime minister
Prince
Principalía
Pursuivant
Queen regnant
Rais
Referee (association football)
Regnal title
Reiks
Roman emperor
Scoutmaster
Secretary (title)
Secretary of the Government
Sheriff
Shikken
Shirvanshah
Shōgun
Sovereign
Spahbed
Speaker (politics)
Special agent
Sultan
Sultana (title)
Superintendent (education)
Supervisor
Supreme Allied Commander
Supreme Leader of Iran
Surgeon
Taffeltäckare
Teacher
Technocrat
Toxic leader
Tribal chief
Trịnh lords
Tyrant
Usurper
Very important person
Vizier (Ancient Egypt)
Vizier (Ebla)
Warlord
Wuzurg framadar
Youth leadership

See also
 List of corporate titles